Tidey is a surname. Notable people with the surname include:

Alec Tidey (born 1955), Canadian ice hockey player
Alfred Tidey (1808–1892), English miniature-painter
H. Gordon Tidey (1879–1971), English railway photographer
Henry Tidey (1814–1872), British watercolorist
Saskia Tidey (born 1993), Irish sailor